General Dominique-Joseph René Vandamme, Count of Unseburg (5 November 1770, in Cassel, Nord – 15 July 1830) was a French military officer, who fought in the Napoleonic Wars.  He was a dedicated career soldier with a reputation as an excellent division and corps commander. However he had a nasty disposition that alienated his colleagues, and would publicly criticize Napoleon, who never appointed him marshal.

Biography
Vandamme enlisted in the army in 1786 and rapidly rose through the ranks. At the outbreak of the French Revolutionary Wars in 1793 he was a Brigadier General. He served in this rank in the campaigns of 1794 in the Low Countries, 1795 on the Rhine and 1796 in Germany. He was court-martialled for looting and suspended. Reinstated, he fought at the First Battle of Stockach on 25 March 1799, but disagreement with General Jean Moreau led to his being sent to occupation duties in Holland. At the Battle of Austerlitz in 1805 he led his division, alongside Gen. St. Hilaire's, as part of Marshal Soult's IV Corps in the charge that captured the Pratzen Heights. For his leadership  he was awarded the Grand Eagle of the Legion of Honour.

In 1806-7 his forces besieged Breslau, and after finally taking it he ordered the fortifications to be levelled. He was named Count of Unsebourg by Napoleon I after the Silesian campaign during the War of the Fourth Coalition. In the campaign of 1809, he led a small allied corps from Württemberg in the battles of Abensberg, Landshut, and Eckmühl.

Reportedly a brutal and violent soldier, renowned for insubordination and looting, Napoleon is said to have told him, "If I had two of you, the only solution would be to have one hang the other". Napoleon later also commented:

"If I were to launch a campaign against Lucifer in Hell, Vandamme will be commanding the Vanguard."

In the campaign of 1813, Vandamme's I Corps attacked the Allied Bohemian Army as it tried to retreat after the Battle of Dresden. While his troops were engaged in the Battle of Kulm, a corps led by the Prussian General Friedrich Graf Kleist von Nollendorf fortuitously attacked the French from the rear. In the consequent disaster, Vandamme and 13,000 of his men were captured. In his captivity, he appears to have been treated with especial harshness, and at the end of the war he was forbidden to enter Paris, and sent to Cassel by Louis XVIII. He was thus free of all obligations towards the Bourbons, and when Napoleon returned, joined him without hesitation. The emperor made him a peer of France.

In the campaign of 1815 Vandamme was in command of the III Corps, under the direction of Marshal Emmanuel Grouchy. He urged Grouchy to join Napoleon at the Battle of Waterloo, but Grouchy preferred to pursue the Prussian 3rd Corps under General Johann von Thielmann, winning the Battle of Wavre, but losing the war. After the restoration of Louis XVIII of France Vandamme was exiled to America and settled in Philadelphia amongst other French military exiles.  General Vandamme was allowed to return to France by the ordinance of 1 December 1819. He was re-established in the service in the Ètat-major Général, until his final retirement on 1 January 1825. Afterwards he lived alternatively in Cassel and Ghent, occupying himself with the writing of his memoirs. He died in his native Cassel, aged 59.

VANDAMME is one of the names inscribed under the Arc de Triomphe.

Notes

References
 (there is a recent edition)

Further reading
 Gallaher, John G. Napoleon’s Enfant Terrible: General Dominique Vandamme (2008).  excerpt

1770 births
1830 deaths
People from Nord (French department)
French commanders of the Napoleonic Wars
French military personnel of the French Revolutionary Wars
Names inscribed under the Arc de Triomphe
French prisoners of war in the Napoleonic Wars
French people of Flemish descent